Pantelimon is a commune in Constanța County, Northern Dobruja, Romania.

The commune includes five villages:
 Pantelimon (historical name: Pantelimon de Sus until 1968)
 Călugăreni (historical name: Caceamac)
 Nistorești (historical name: Cuciuc-Chioi)
 Pantelimon de Jos
 Runcu (historical name: Terzichioi)

Demographics
At the 2011 census, Pantelimon had 1,457 Romanians (99.86%), 2 others (0.14%).

References

Communes in Constanța County
Localities in Northern Dobruja